Francis John Savile Foljambe (9 April 1830 – 5 February 1917) was a British Liberal Member of Parliament.

Early life
Foljambe was born at Osberton Hall, near Worksop, Nottinghamshire on 9 April 1830. He was the eldest son and heir of George Savile Foljambe and Harriet Emily Mary Milner (a daughter of Sir William Milner, 4th Baronet). After his mother's death, his father remarried to Selina, Viscountess Milton, widow of William Charles FitzWilliam, Viscount Milton (son of the 5th Earl Fitzwilliam) and daughter of Charles Jenkinson, 3rd Earl of Liverpool. From this marriage, he had a younger half-brother, fellow Liberal politician Cecil Foljambe, 1st Earl of Liverpool, and a step-sister, Hon. Mary Selina Charlotte Fitzwilliam, who later married Henry Portman, 2nd Viscount Portman.

He was educated at Eton and Christ Church, Oxford.

Career
Foljambe was elected as a Member of Parliament for East Retford in the 1857 general election. He was re-elected at every general election until the 1885 election, when the seat was abolished. He was appointed a member of the Privy Council in 1895.

In 1889, he succeeded Antony Gibbs as the High Sheriff of Nottinghamshire and was, in turn, succeeded by Sir Charles Seely.

Personal life
On 20 February 1856, he married Lady Gertrude Emily Acheson, eldest daughter of Archibald Acheson, 3rd Earl of Gosford and Lady Theodosia Brabazon (daughter of John Brabazon, 10th Earl of Meath). Together, they had three sons, including:

 George Savile Foljambe (1856–1920), a cricketer who married Dora Margaret Warre, a daughter of Dr. Edmond Warre, Headmaster of Eton.
 Godfrey Acheson Thornhagh Foljambe (1869–1942), also a cricketer who married Judith Frances Wright, the daughter of FitzHerbert Wright and sister of H. FitzHerbert Wright.
 Hubert Francis Fitzwilliam Brabazon Foljambe (1872–1914), who married Gladys Bewicke-Copley, a daughter of Gen. Robert Calverley Alington Bewicke-Copley of Sprotborough Hall in 1909. He was killed in action during the Great War at the First Battle of the Aisne.

Foljambe died on 5 February 1917. His widow Lady Gertrude Foljambe died on 17 December 1927.

Descendants
Through his eldest son, he was a grandfather of cricketer Edmond Walter Savile Foljambe (1890–1960), a soldier during World War I who married Judith Harriet Wright (daughter of the first-class cricketer H. FitzHerbert Wright, who was also the brother-in-law of his uncle Godfrey) in 1940.

References

External links
 

1830 births
1917 deaths
Alumni of Christ Church, Oxford
High Sheriffs of Nottinghamshire
Members of the Privy Council of the United Kingdom
Liberal Party (UK) MPs for English constituencies
People educated at Eton College
Whig (British political party) MPs for English constituencies
UK MPs 1857–1859
UK MPs 1859–1865
UK MPs 1865–1868
UK MPs 1868–1874
UK MPs 1874–1880
UK MPs 1880–1885